Pedro Berruezo Martín (22 May 1945 – 7 January 1973) was a Spanish footballer who represented CD Málaga and Sevilla. Having already collapsed in games against Alicante, Sabadell and Barakaldo, Berruezo suffered a fatal heart attack during a match against Pontevedra on 7 January 1973.

Career statistics

Club

Notes

References

1945 births
1973 deaths
Spanish footballers
Spain youth international footballers
Association football forwards
CD Málaga footballers
Sevilla FC players
Segunda División players
La Liga players
Footballers from Melilla
Association football players who died while playing
Sport deaths in Spain